The 2020 Louisiana–Monroe Warhawks softball team represented the University of Louisiana at Monroe in the 2020 NCAA Division I softball season. The Warhawks played their home games at Geo-Surfaces Field at the ULM Softball Complex. The Warhawks were led by second year head coach Molly Fichtner and were members of the Sun Belt Conference.

On March 12, the Sun Belt Conference announced the indefinite suspension of all spring athletics, including softball, due to the increasing risk of the COVID-19 pandemic.  On March 16, the Sun Belt formally announced the cancelation of all spring sports, thus ending their season definitely.

Preseason

Sun Belt Conference Coaches Poll
The Sun Belt Conference Coaches Poll was released on January 29, 2020. Louisiana–Monroe was picked to finish ninth in the Sun Belt Conference with 26 votes.

Preseason All-Sun Belt team
Summer Ellyson (LA, SR, Pitcher)
Megan Kleist (LA, SR, Pitcher)
Julie Rawls (LA, SR, Catcher)
Reagan Wright (UTA, SR, Catcher)
Katie Webb (TROY, SR, 1st Base)
Kaitlyn Alderink (LA, SR, 2nd Base)
Hailey Mackay (TXST, SR, 3rd Base)
Alissa Dalton (LA, SR, Shortstop)
Jayden Mount (ULM, SR, Shortstop)
Whitney Walton (UTA, SR, Shortstop)
Tara Oltmann (TXST, JR, Shortstop)
Courtney Dean (CCU, JR, Outfield)
Mekhia Freeman (GASO, SR, Outfield)
Sarah Hudek (LA, SR, Outfield)
Raina O'Neal (LA, JR, Outfield)
Bailey Curry (LA, JR, Designated Player/1st Base)

National Softball Signing Day

Roster

Coaching staff

Schedule and results

Schedule Source:
*Rankings are based on the team's current ranking in the NFCA/USA Softball poll.

References

Louisiana–Monroe
Louisiana–Monroe Warhawks softball seasons
Louisiana–Monroe softball